Evelyn Berezin (April 12, 1925 – December 8, 2018) was an American computer designer of the first computer-driven word processor. She also worked on computer-controlled systems for airline reservations.

Early life and education 
Berezin was born in the east Bronx in 1925 to Jewish immigrants from the Russian Empire, and attended Christopher Columbus High School. She started university at the age of sixteen at Hunter College in January 1941, studying Economics instead of the Physics she preferred because it was preferred as a subject for women at that time. After WWII started, new opportunities made the study of physics possible with a scholarship at New York University, plus free classes at both Hunter and Brooklyn Polytech during the war years.  At the same time, she worked full-time during the day as an assistant in the Rheology Department of the Research Division of the International Printing Company (IPI). Going to university at night, she received her B.S. in physics in 1946.

Career and contributions
Berezin began graduate work at New York University, holding a fellowship from the United States Atomic Energy Commission. In 1951 she accepted a job with the Electronic Computer Corporation and began there as head of the Logic Design Department. Berezin was the only person doing the logic design for computers being developed by ECC. In 1957 ECC was purchased by Underwood Corporation (originally known as the Underwood Typewriter Company). Here, she designed a number of computers which were very general in structure but individual in specific application. Among them was a system for the US Army for range calculations, a system for controlling the distribution of magazines, and what is now considered the first office computer.

The Underwood Typewriter Company was not able to continue the development beyond 1957, and Berezin went to a company called Teleregister, formerly a division of Western Union.

Using vacuum tube computers and electromechanical switching, Teleregister had built one of the first airline reservation systems, the "Reservisor". Using newly available transistor technology, Berezin developed a computerized reservation system for United Airlines which was one of the largest computer systems at that time, controlling 60 cities in a communication system that provided 1 second response time. While working for Teleregister, Berezin also developed the first computerized banking system.

In 1960, Berezin had a job offer from the New York Stock Exchange retracted strictly because she was a woman, despite being one of few qualified for the job.

In 1968, Berezin had the idea for a word processor to simplify the work of secretaries, and in 1969 she founded Redactron Corporation, which became a public company and delivered thousands of systems to customers throughout its international marketing organization. The company's main product was called the "Data Secretary" and it was the size of a small refrigerator, had no screen, and the keyboard and printer was an IBM Selectric typewriter.

In the 1970s, although the market continued strong the economy suffered a serious inflation, increasing interest rates to a level (16%) which was untenable for a business like Redactron which operated in a world in which equipment was rented. The company was sold to the Burroughs Corporation in 1976, and integrated into its office equipment division. Berezin stayed on until 1979.

In 1980, Berezin served as President of Greenhouse Management Company, General Partner of a venture capital group dedicated to early stage high technology companies.

Throughout her career she received honorary doctorates from Adelphi University and Eastern Michigan University. Berezin also served on the Boards of CIGNA, Standard Microsystems, Koppers, and Datapoint.

Berezin served on the Board of the Stony Brook Foundation at Stony Brook University, the Brookhaven National Laboratory and the Boyce Thompson Institute.

Berezin established the Berezin-Wilenitz Endowment, which will give the value of her estate to fund either a chair, professorship, or research fund at Stony Brook in any field of science as stated in her will and testament. In addition to the endowment, Berezin and her late husband funded the Sam and Rose Berezin Endowed Scholarship, a full-tuition scholarship that is awarded to an undergraduate student who plans to study in the field of science, engineering or mathematics, in honor of her parents. Berezin and Wilenitz also established the Israel Wilenitz Endowment. This provides discretionary funds to the Linguistics Department at Stony Brook University, where Wilenitz received a Master's Degree.

Personal life
Berezin was married for 51 years to Israel Wilenitz, a chemical engineer, born in 1922 in London. Wilenitz died on February 20, 2003. Berezin died on December 8, 2018, at the age of 93 while in treatment for cancer.

Awards
 2006 Long Island Technology Hall of Fame
 2006 Women Achiever's Against the Odds Honoree for the Long Island Fund for Women and Girls
 2011 Women in Technology International (WITI) Hall of Fame
 Long Island Distinguished Leadership Award
 Top 100 Business Women in the United States in BusinessWeek magazine
 Honorary Doctorate from Adelphi University
 Honorary Doctorate from Eastern Michigan University
 In 2015, she was made a Fellow of the Computer History Museum for "her early work in computer design and a lifetime of entrepreneurial activity."
She was inducted into the National Inventors Hall of Fame in 2020.

Patents
 Information Transfer Apparatus
 Electronic Data File Processor
 Information Transfer System
 On-Line Data Transfer Apparatus
 Electrical Assemblage
 Data Processing System
 Arithmetic Device
 Electronic Calculator with Dynamic Recirculating Storage Register
 Control means with Record Sensing for an Electronic Calculator

References

1925 births
2018 deaths
20th-century American inventors
20th-century American scientists
20th-century American women scientists
American computer scientists
American people of Russian-Jewish descent
American women computer scientists
Hunter College alumni
Jewish American inventors
New York University alumni
Scientists from the Bronx
Transport software
Word processors
21st-century American Jews
21st-century American women